Belforte Monferrato is a commune in the Province of Alessandria, region of Piedmont, Italy, located about  southeast of Turin and about  south of Alessandria.

It is home to a castle, built in the 15th to 17th centuries around a 12th-century tower of the Republic of Genoa.

References

Cities and towns in Piedmont